Natalin may refer to the following places:
Natalin, Chełm County in Lublin Voivodeship (east Poland)
Natalin, Gmina Annopol in Lublin Voivodeship (east Poland)
Natalin, Gmina Urzędów in Lublin Voivodeship (east Poland)
Natalin, Lubartów County in Lublin Voivodeship (east Poland)
Natalin, Lublin County in Lublin Voivodeship (east Poland)
Natalin, Łuków County in Lublin Voivodeship (east Poland)
Natalin, Grójec County in Masovian Voivodeship (east-central Poland)
Natalin, Radom County in Masovian Voivodeship (east-central Poland)
Natalin, Wyszków County in Masovian Voivodeship (east-central Poland)